Oliver Fox may refer to:
 Oliver Fox (writer)
 Oliver Fox (rugby union)